François Eliès, born Fañch Eliès and better known by the pseudonym Abeozen, (1896 Saint-Sauveur, Finistère – 1963 La Baule) was a Breton nationalist, novelist and dramatist who wrote in the Breton language. Abeozen was also a noted scholar of the Welsh language.

Abeozen started contributing to the Breton literary journal Gwalarn in 1925. He worked as a teacher in Saint-Brieuc from 1927 to 1940 and founded the local branch of the communist Secours Rouge organization. During the German occupation of France, he joined Roparz Hemon at the newly founded Radio Rennes Bretagne and wrote for La Bretagne, L'Heure Bretonne and Arvor. He was also a member of Seiz Breur and the Institut celtique de Bretagne.

As France was liberated Abeozen, like many Breton nationalists, was arrested for collaborating with the German occupants and spent fourteen months in prison. (See also Breton nationalism and World War II for the political background.) He was further fired from the Éducation nationale and forbidden to stay in administrative Brittany.

He was considered one of the best orators and writers in the Breton language of his time. His work on the Breton language history was essential for further studies.

Bibliography 
Partial bibliography
 Breton translation of Mabinogion.
 Lennaduriou kembraek (XVIIvet - XIXvet kantved). Dibabet ha troet gant Abeozen; Brest, Gwalarn, n° 108, Du 1937, pp 3–43.
 Geriadurig brezonek krenn. Rennes. 1941. Sterenn
 Yezadur berr ar c'hembraeg. Skridoù Breizh - Brest. 1942.
 Dremm an Ankou (translation: The face of death). Skridoù Breizh - Brest : La Baule. 1942.
 Hervelina Geraouell. Éditions de Bretagne : Skridou Breiz - Brest. 1943, Hor yezh - Lesneven 1988
 Marvailhou loened. Éditions de Bretagne : Skridou Breiz - Brest. 1943
 Skol vihan ar c'hembraeg. Skridou Breizh - Brest. 1944. (avec Kerverziou)
 Bisousig kazh an tevenn. Al Liamm. 1954, An Here - Quimper, 1987.
 Istor lennegezh vrezhonek an amzer-vremañ, Al Liamm, 1957. Histoire de la littérature bretonne.
 Damskeud eus hol lennegezh kozh. Al Liamm. 1962.
 Yezhadur nevez ar C'hembraeg. Hor Yezh - Brest. 1964. (avec Goulven Pennaod)
 Pirc'hirin kala-goanv. Brest, Al Liamm, 1969, Al Liamm - Brest. 1986.
 Pevar skourr ar Mabinogi troidigezh diwar skrid al levr gwenn, kentskrid ha notennou gant F. Elies Abeozen. Quimper, Preder, 1980.
 Breiz a gan. Chorale Saint-Matthieu - Morlaix. 1980.
 Pevar skourr ar mabinogi. Preder - Plomelin. 1980.
 Kan ar spered hag ar Galon. Mouludarioù Hor Yezh - Lesneven. 1983. photogr. de Daniele Jego
 Barzhaz 1837-1939. Hor yezh - Lesneven. 1987
 Argantael. Al Liamm - Brest. 1989. préf. de Gwendal Denez

Notes 

The above article was created as a translation of its counterpart on the French Wikipedia. (Specifically this version)

References 

1896 births
1963 deaths
Breton nationalists
Writers from Brittany
French male writers
Breton-language writers
20th-century French male writers